Roman Nikolaevich Oksiuta (born 21 August 1970) is a Russian former professional ice hockey player who played in the National Hockey League for the Edmonton Oilers, Vancouver Canucks, Mighty Ducks of Anaheim and the Pittsburgh Penguins.

Playing career
Oksiuta played a total of 153 regular season games, scoring 46 goals and 41 assists for 87 points and collecting 100 penalty minutes. Oksiuta was drafted in the 10th round, 202nd overall by the New York Rangers in the 1989 NHL Entry Draft but was traded to Edmonton for Oilers' captain, Kevin Lowe, while he was still playing in Russia. He also had a spell in Finland's SM-liiga for KalPa and Lukko.  He returned to Russia in 1999 and played in the Vysshaya Liga for Khimik Voskresensk where he began his career in 1987.  In 2003 the team were promoted to the Russian Super League.  He retired in 2006.

Oksiuta represented the Soviet national team and later the Russian national team at the IIHF World Championships; winning gold (1989) and silver (1990) with the Soviet Union.

Career statistics

Regular season and playoffs

International

External links

1970 births
Living people
Cape Breton Oilers players
Edmonton Oilers players
Fort Wayne Komets players
Furuset Ishockey players
HC Khimik Voskresensk players
KalPa players
Lukko players
Mighty Ducks of Anaheim players
New York Rangers draft picks
People from Murmansk
Pittsburgh Penguins players
Russian expatriates in Norway
Russian ice hockey right wingers
Soviet ice hockey right wingers
Vancouver Canucks players
Sportspeople from Murmansk Oblast